Podiatric Medical School is the term used to designate the medical institutions  which educate students and train them to be podiatric physicians, which diagnose and treat conditions affecting the foot, ankle, and related structures of the leg. In the United States, only schools which are accredited by the Council on Podiatric Medical Education (CPME) may earn the status of being a Podiatric Medical School.  The Doctor of Podiatric Medicine degree is commonly abbreviated D.P.M. degree. The D.P.M. degree is a prerequisite for an individual to be accepted into a CPME accredited residency. A Doctor of Podiatric Medicine or podiatrist, is defined as a physician and surgeon of the foot and ankle.

United States
Podiatric medical education in the United States consists of four (4) years of graduate education with the first two focusing primarily upon the sciences and the last two focusing upon didactic, clinical, and hospital externship experience; similar to education undertaken at other medical schools but with more exposure to the foot and ankle and its related pathologies.[1] After successful completion of these four (4) years of professional education, students are granted a Doctor of Podiatric Medicine (D.P.M.) degree.

Post-graduate training
In order to enhance the progression from student to competent podiatric physicians, graduates are required to complete a three-year or four-year post-graduate training residency before practicing podiatric medicine.   Each individual residency program must be approved by the Council on Podiatric Medical Education of the American Podiatric Medical Association. The American Association of Colleges of Podiatric Medicine provides a complete list of approved Podiatric Residency Programs.

Accreditation and governing bodies

The American Association of Colleges of Podiatric Medicine governs many aspects of Podiatric Medical Education including a mentor network, a centralized application service for prospective students, the Central Application Service for Podiatric Residencies, and the Centralized Residency Interview Program. Schools are also accredited by governmental agencies. 

The American Podiatric Medical Students' Association represents students of podiatry.

Schools in United States
There are ten podiatric medical schools accredited by the CPME in the United States:

Canada

There is one podiatric medical school in Canada based in Trois-Rivieres (Quebec) leading to the D.P.M. degree. It is not accredited by the CPME in the United States, but its curriculum is based on the standards established by the CPME  and is approved and accredited by the Quebec Order of Podiatrists and L'Office des professions du Québec.

Université du Québec à Trois-Rivières  and 

The Faculty of Medicine and Dentistry at the University of Alberta is currently developing a business plan to establish the second podiatric medical school in Canada by 2012.

References

External links
 American College of Foot and Ankle Surgeons

Podiatry